Trithemis dorsalis, the highland dropwing, is a species of dragonfly in the family Libellulidae. It is found in Angola, the Democratic Republic of the Congo, Guinea, Kenya, Mozambique, Sierra Leone, South Africa, Tanzania, Uganda, Zambia, Zimbabwe, possibly Burundi, and possibly Malawi. Its natural habitats are subtropical or tropical moist lowland forests, dry savanna, moist savanna, subtropical or tropical dry shrubland, subtropical or tropical moist shrubland, rivers, freshwater marshes, and intermittent freshwater marshes.

References

External links

 Text for highland dropwing from South African Dragonfly Atlas 

dorsalis
Taxonomy articles created by Polbot
Insects described in 1842